Ahn Chai-hong (December 31, 1891 – March 1, 1965) was a Korean activist, politician, and journalist who participated in the Korean independence movement.

See also 
 Korea Independence Party - Ahn Jae-hong was a member of the party here.
 Democratic Independent Party

External links

 Biography on the Ministry of Patriots and Veterans Affairs

1891 births
1965 deaths
Korean independence activists
Waseda University alumni
Place of birth missing